John Brady is an Australian whip cracking expert. He has performed in leading shows, fairs and special events, as well as in many television shows and films, including being a stuntman in the Clint Eastwood film Paint Your Wagon.

Television appearances include You Asked for It and It's Incredible.

John Brady performed original routines with both stockwhips and rope tricks during the Musical theatre show, The Man from Snowy River: Arena Spectacular, as well as playing the character Saltbush Bill in the show.

Because of his rope tricks and whipcracking expertise, John Bradly has been inducted into the Australian Stockman's Hall of Fame in Longreach, Queensland, Australia, and DVDs have been released of his whip-cracking.

References

Sources
 Programme for The Man from Snowy River: Arena Spectacular

External links
 John Brady - National Library of Australia

Australian male film actors
Australian male stage actors
Australian male television actors
Australian male musical theatre actors
People from Queensland
Whip arts
Year of birth missing (living people)
Living people